Borzyn is a rural locality (a village) in Gorod Vyazniki, Vyaznikovsky District, Vladimir Oblast, Russia. The population was 36 as of 2010.

Geography 
Borzyn is located 9 km west of Vyazniki (the district's administrative centre) by road. Chudinovo is the nearest rural locality.

References 

Rural localities in Vyaznikovsky District